Osbornoceros is an extinct artiodactyl genus of the family Antilocapridae. All antilocaprid species are extinct except for the pronghorn. Osbornoceros osborni is the only known species of the genus Osbornoceros. Osbornoceros lived during the Late Miocene around 7 to 6 million years ago in what is now North America. It is well represented in fossil discoveries, with nearly a dozen specimens having been found to date. All come from the Chamita Formation in a quarry near Lyden, New Mexico, the site of numerous other finds such as that of Chamitataxus, a prehistoric badger that lived at the same time. The holotype specimen of Osbornoceros was discovered in 1937 and many more were found nearby during further expeditions.

Osbornoceros was strikingly similar to today's pronghorn; it was lightly built and had a series of small horns that protruded from its skull. It was, like its relatives, a quadruped herbivore and grazed on the grassy plains of its time. If Osbornoceros had any predators is unknown and much is still unknown about its paleobiology, but it is assumed to have been similar to the pronghorn and its extinct relatives. Osbornoceros was covered in a short pelage and was most likely a good runner.

References

External links
Paleodb - Stats on Osbonoceros.
AMNH - List of Osbornoceros specimens.

Prehistoric pronghorns
Miocene even-toed ungulates
Miocene mammals of North America
Prehistoric even-toed ungulate genera
Fossil taxa described in 1937